Shurak-e Vosta (also Romanized as Shūrak-e Vosţá; also known as Shūrak-e Mīān, Shūrak-e Vasaţ, Shūrk-e Mīān, and Sūrk Vasati) is a village in Javar Rural District, in the Central District of Kuhbanan County, Kerman Province, Iran. At the 2006 census, its population was 7, in 4 families.

References 

Populated places in Kuhbanan County